is a Japanese manga artist. She is also known in the manga community under the name , under which she is the writer and artist of Juvenile Orion and Sekirei. 
Ashika Sakura has done numerous manga under the yaoi and shotacon genre, including Sensitive Pornograph.

Works 
Anatadake Ga Suki (You are My One and Only)
Category: Freaks
Kusuriyubi ni Himitsu no Koi (Secret Love on the Ringfinger)
Adult na Kaihatsushitsu (The Exploration of Adulthood)
Anoko to Boku to Anohito to (Honey Baby, Me, and the Other)
Bucchouzura ni Koi wo Shite (Love is made with a Sullen Look)
Himitsu no Kemonotachi (The Secret Beasts)
Nemureru Kimi no Barairo no Kuchibiru (Your Rose-Colored Lips Can Sleep)
Tenshi no Hâtorizumu (The Heart-Rhythm of Angels)
Sensitive Pornograph
Worlds End Garden
Koiiro Kougyoku
Pretty Standard
Biroudo no Tensoku (The Velvet Footbindings)
Adult na Kaihatsushitsu (The Exploration of Adulthood)
Sekirei
Night Walkers
Tokyo Renaikitan
Sekai no Owari ga Furu Yoru ni
Boku no Suki na Sensei (The Teacher I Love)
Returners ~Kigensha~

References

External links
 https://web.archive.org/web/20070418014559/http://www.jpqueen.com/onlineshop/SearchResult.asp?
 http://sumire.sakura.ne.jp/~heaven/ 

Manga artists
Living people
Year of birth missing (living people)